Yongkang railway station was a railway station in Yongkang, Jinhua, Zhejiang, China. It was used by both passengers and freight.

History
The station opened on 21 April 1996. In April 2000, freight services were introduced. The station was closed on 16 June 2021 following a project to divert the Jinhua–Wenzhou railway away from the city centre and instead along the alignment of the Jinhua–Wenzhou high-speed railway. As a result, passenger services were moved to the existing Yongkang South railway station, while freight operations were moved to a newly-built station, Yongkang East.

References

Railway stations in Zhejiang
Railway stations in China opened in 1996
Railway stations closed in 2021
Buildings and structures in Jinhua
Yongkang, Zhejiang